Pseuderosia is a genus of moths belonging to the subfamily Drepaninae.

Species
 Pseuderosia cristata Snellen, 1889
 Pseuderosia desmierdechenoni Holloway, 1998
 Pseuderosia humiliata (Walker, 1861)

References

Drepaninae
Drepanidae genera